This is a list of broadcast television stations serving cities in the Canadian province of Nova Scotia.

See also
List of television stations in Canada
Lists of television stations in Atlantic Canada
Media in Canada

References
https://www.cbc.ca/news/canada/nova-scotia/community/halifax-transmission-update-1.5979550

Nova Scotia

Television stations